Dimeh Darb (also Romanized as Dīmeh Darb, Deymeh Darb, and Deymeh Derb; also known as Deyme Derb) is a village in Howmeh Rural District, in the Central District of Haftgel County, Khuzestan Province, Iran. At the 2006 census, its population was 67, in 19 families.

References 

Populated places in Haftkel County